Nils Olav Fjeldheim (born 18 April 1977 in Tysværvåg) is a Norwegian sprint canoer and marathon canoeist who competed from 1998 to 2004. Competing in two Summer Olympics, he won a bronze in the K-2 1000 m event at Athens in 2004.

Fjeldhelm also won a complete set of medals at the ICF Canoe Sprint World Championships with a gold (K-2 1000 m: 2001), a silver (K-2 1000 m: 2002), and a bronze (K-4 200 m: 1998).

Fjeldheim retired from international racing in 2005. He lives in Tysvær, Norway.

References

External links 
 

1977 births
Living people
Norwegian male canoeists
Olympic canoeists of Norway
Olympic bronze medalists for Norway
Olympic medalists in canoeing
Canoeists at the 2000 Summer Olympics
Canoeists at the 2004 Summer Olympics
Medalists at the 2004 Summer Olympics
ICF Canoe Sprint World Championships medalists in kayak
Medalists at the ICF Canoe Marathon World Championships
People from Tysvær
Sportspeople from Rogaland
21st-century Norwegian people